Dor is a rural locality (a village) in Staroselskoye Rural Settlement, Vologodsky District, Vologda Oblast, Russia. The population was 11 as of 2002.

Geography 
The distance to Vologda is 54 km, to Striznevo is 13 km. Novgorodovo, Derevyagino, Skripilovo are the nearest rural localities.

References 

Rural localities in Vologodsky District